Volleyball events were contested at the 1970 Asian Games in Bangkok, Thailand.

Medalists

Medal table

Results

Men

|}

Women

|}

References
 Men's results
 Women's results

 
1970 Asian Games events
1970
Asian Games
Asian Games